Blind Justice is a 1994 American Western television film on HBO directed by Richard Spence and starring Armand Assante, Robert Davi, Elisabeth Shue, Adam Baldwin, and Jack Black. First Nations actor Jimmy Herman (Dances with Wolves) appears as a shaman. It was shot entirely in Arizona.

Plot
Canaan, a mysterious gunfighter left nearly blind from Civil War combat, roams through Mexico with a baby he has sworn to protect. On his way to a town where a family will supposedly adopt the baby, Canaan passes through a border town where U.S. Cavalry officers assigned to deliver a shipment of silver are under attack from bandits. With some reluctance, Canaan steps in to help the soldiers.

Cast
 Armand Assante as Canaan
 Elisabeth Shue as Caroline
 Robert Davi as Alacran
 Adam Baldwin as Sergeant Hastings
 Ian McElhinney as Father Malone
 Danny Nucci as Roberto
 Jason Rodriguez as Hector
 M. C. Gainey as "Bull"
 Titus Welliver as Sumner
 Michael O'Neill as Spencer Heyman
 Douglas Roberts as Captain Teller
 Gary Carlos Cervantes as Luis
 Jesse Dabson as Private Wilcox
 Clayton Landey as Ernie Fowler
 James Oscar Lee as Beauchamp
 Ric San Nicholas as Remick
 Jimmy Herman as Shaman
 Jack Black as Private
 Daniel O'Haco as Scout
 Jeff O'Haco as Vato
 Forrie J. Smith as Coyote
 Michael A. Goorjian as Soldier #1
 Tom Hodges as Soldier #2
 Tori Bridges as Jessica Canaan (uncredited)

External links
 

1994 television films
1994 films
1990s English-language films
1994 Western (genre) films
American Western (genre) television films
Films produced by Neal H. Moritz
Films scored by Richard Gibbs
Films set in Mexico
Original Film films